Alastair MacLeod (2 November 1924 – April 2002) was a British rower. He competed in the men's eight event at the 1952 Summer Olympics.

References

External links
 
 

1924 births
2002 deaths
British male rowers
Olympic rowers of Great Britain
Rowers at the 1952 Summer Olympics
Place of birth missing